Dominik Kother (born 16 March 2000) is a German professional footballer who plays as a forward for 3. Liga club Waldhof Mannheim on loan from Karlsruher SC.

Career
Kother made his professional debut for Karlsruher SC in the 2. Bundesliga on 14 December 2019, coming on as a substitute in the 89th minute for Marc Lorenz in the home match against Greuther Fürth, which finished as a 1–5 loss.

On 31 January 2022, Kother joined Waldhof Mannheim on loan.

References

External links
 
 
 
 

2000 births
Living people
People from Bruchsal
Sportspeople from Karlsruhe (region)
Footballers from Baden-Württemberg
German footballers
Association football forwards
Karlsruher SC players
SV Waldhof Mannheim players
2. Bundesliga players
3. Liga players
Germany under-21 international footballers